Saalivaahanan is a Tamil language film starring Ranjan, T. R. Rajakumari, M. G. Ramachandran and K. L. V. Vasantha. The film was released in 1945. No print of the film is known to survive, making it a lost film.

Cast 
Male
Ranjan as Saalivahanan
M. G. Ramachandran as Vikramaditya
Nagercoil K. Mahadevan
T. S. Balaiah
N. S. Krishnan
Female
T. R. Rajakumari as Princess Chandralekha
K. L. V. Vasantha as Vikramaditya's sister
M. R. Santhanalakshmi
T. A. Madhuram

Production 
The film had a sequence, a love scene between Ranjan and T. R. Rajakumari, in colour. It was done by hand-tinting each frame of the sequence. M. G. Ramachandran, who was acting in minor roles at that time, played as villain. According to film historian Randor Guy, during the shooting of a sword fight between Ranjan and Ramachandran, the latter complained to the director that "Ranjan was putting in too much of realism in the fencing which was likely to hurt him!"

Soundtrack 
 Kayirai edutthukko by N. S. Krishnan & T. A. Madhuram

Reception 
According to film historian Randor Guy, Saalivaahanan did not do well at the box office and the producers lost heavily in the process. He stated the film would be remembered for coloured sequence and the comedy of Krishnan-Mathuram.

References 

1940s Tamil-language films
1945 films
Lost Indian films
Indian black-and-white films
1940s lost films